Litavka is a river in the Czech Republic, the right tributary of the Berounka. It originates in the Brdy mountain range at the elevation of 736 m and flows to Beroun, where it enters the Berounka. It is 54.9 km long, and its basin area is 629 km2.

It flows through Příbram, Trhové Dušníky, Čenkov, Jince, Libomyšl, Chodouň and Králův Dvůr. In Příbram it flows just near the west stand of the Na Litavce football stadium.

References

External links

Rivers of the Central Bohemian Region